Emmelia is a genus of bird dropping moths in the family Noctuidae, found primarily in Africa and the Palearctic.

Taxonomy
Emmelia is a name available as a genus name for a group of butterflies of the subfamily Acontiinae (Noctuidae). However, its status is uncertain. The name Emmelia is also known as subgenus in the genus Acontia and it is sometimes considered a synonym of Acontia.

Species
These 36 species belong to the genus Emmelia:

 Emmelia albovittata Hacker, 2013  (Africa)
 Emmelia amarei Hacker, Legrain & Fibiger, 2010  (Africa)
 Emmelia atripars Hampson, 1914  (Africa)
 Emmelia bellula (Hacker, 2010)
 Emmelia bethunebakeri Hacker, Legrain & Fibiger, 2010  (Africa)
 Emmelia binominata (Butler, 1892)
 Emmelia callima Bethune-Baker, 1911  (Africa)
 Emmelia citrelinea Bethune-Baker, 1911  (Africa)
 Emmelia dichroa Hampson, 1914  (Africa and temperate Asia)
 Emmelia eburnea Hacker, 2010
 Emmelia esperiana Hacker, Legrain & Fibiger, 2010  (Africa)
 Emmelia fascialis (Hampson, 1894)
 Emmelia fastrei Hacker, Legrain & Fibiger, 2010  (Africa)
 Emmelia fuscoalba (Hacker, 2010)
 Emmelia homonyma Hacker, Legrain & Fibiger, 2010  (Africa)
 Emmelia karachiensis Swinhoe, 1889  (Africa and temperate Asia)
 Emmelia lanzai (Berio, 1985)  (Africa)
 Emmelia manakhana Hacker, Legrain & Fibiger, 2010  (temperate Asia)
 Emmelia mascheriniae (Berio, 1985)  (Africa)
 Emmelia mineti Hacker, 2011  (Africa)
 Emmelia notha Hacker, Legrain & Fibiger, 2010  (Africa)
 Emmelia nubila Hampson, 1910  (Africa and temperate Asia)
 Emmelia obliqua Hacker, Legrain & Fibiger, 2010  (Africa)
 Emmelia paraalba Hacker, Legrain & Fibiger, 2010  (Africa)
 Emmelia philbyi (Wiltshire, 1988)  (temperate Asia)
 Emmelia praealba Hacker, Legrain & Fibiger, 2010  (Africa)
 Emmelia purpurata Hacker, Legrain & Fibiger, 2010  (Africa)
 Emmelia robertbecki Hacker, Legrain & Fibiger, 2010  (Africa)
 Emmelia saldaitis Hacker, Legrain & Fibiger, 2010
 Emmelia schreieri Hacker, Legrain & Fibiger, 2010  (Africa)
 Emmelia semialba Hampson, 1910  (Africa and temperate Asia)
 Emmelia stassarti (Hacker, 2010)
 Emmelia subnotha (Hacker, 2010)
 Emmelia szunyoghyi Hacker, Legrain & Fibiger, 2010  (Africa)
 Emmelia trabealis (Scopoli, 1763) (spotted sulphur)  (temperate Asia and Europe)
 Emmelia veroxanthia Hacker, Legrain & Fibiger, 2010  (Africa)

References

 Emmelia at Markku Savela's Lepidoptera and Some Other Life Forms
 Natural History Museum Lepidoptera genus database

Acontiinae